Classiebawn Castle is a country house built for The 3rd Viscount Palmerston (1784–1865) on what was formerly a  estate on the Mullaghmore Peninsula near the village of Cliffoney, County Sligo, in the Republic of Ireland. The current castle was largely built in the late 19th century.

Design

It was designed in the Baronial style by Dublin architect James Rawson Carroll, and is constructed from a yellow-brown sandstone brought by sea from County Donegal. It comprises a gabled range with a central tower topped by a conical roofed turret.

The land, which once belonged to the O'Connor Sligo family, was confiscated by the English Parliament to compensate the people who put down an Irish rebellion. Around  of land on which Classiebawn now stands was granted to Sir John Temple (1600–1677), Master of the Rolls in Ireland.

The property passed down to The 3rd Viscount Palmerston, a statesman who served as both British Prime Minister and British Foreign Secretary. It was this Lord Palmerston who commissioned the building of the current Classiebawn Castle and the harbour at Mullaghmore. The house was not complete upon his death in 1865 but was completed in 1874 by his stepson and successor, The Rt. Hon. William Cowper-Temple, P.C., M.P. (later created The 1st Baron Mount Temple). The latter died childless in 1888 and the estate passed to his nephew, The Hon. Evelyn Ashley, the second surviving son of The 7th Earl of Shaftesbury. Evelyn Ashley spent some time there each year and on his death in 1907 was succeeded by his only son, Wilfrid Ashley (later created Baron Mount Temple in a new creation). He also spent his summers at the castle with his daughters Edwina, the future Countess Mountbatten, and Mary (1906–1986), who was Baroness Delamere from 1944 until 1955 as the second wife (of three) of The 4th Baron Delamere.

Mountbatten years
In 1916, the house was cleared and remained empty until 1950. It was inherited in July 1939 by Edwina Mountbatten, who, with her husband Admiral of the Fleet Louis Mountbatten, made several improvements, installing electricity and a mains water supply. After his wife's death in February 1960, Mountbatten, the last Viceroy of India, spent his summers there until his death when his boat was blown up off the coast of Mullaghmore by the IRA in August 1979.

References

External links
 Classiebawn castle by Lord Mountbatten
 Liam Collins: An aristocrat, a beef baron and the castle they both came to love, Independent.ie, 19 May 2016.

Buildings and structures in County Sligo
History of County Sligo
Houses completed in 1874
Mountbatten family